
Le Chevalier is a defunct restaurant in Delft, Netherlands. It was a fine dining restaurant that was awarded one Michelin star in the periods 1980–1989.

Cees Helder, was head chef from 1980 to 1984.

See also
List of Michelin starred restaurants in the Netherlands

References 

Restaurants in the Netherlands
Michelin Guide starred restaurants in the Netherlands
Defunct restaurants in the Netherlands